Silvèstro dell'Aquila, also known as Silvestro di Giacomo da Sulmona, (circa 1450, Sulmona - circa 1504) was an Italian Renaissance sculptor of the late Quattrocento, active in L'Aquila, in the Abruzzo.

It is unclear what his training was, though he shows affinities with Florentine sculpture. Among his works is a wooden San Silvestro (1478) in the Museo Nazionale d'Abruzzo in L'Aquila. He also completed the monument of Cardinal Amico Agnifili (1476-1480) for the Duomo of L'Aquila. He completed the Funeral Monument for Beatrice Camponeschi and Maria Pereyra (1490-1500) and a terracotta group of the Virgin and Child  (circa 1494-99) in the church of San Bernardino, L'Aquila.

References

1450 births
1504 deaths
People from Sulmona
15th-century Italian sculptors
Italian male sculptors
16th-century Italian sculptors